The High Commission for the Republic of Cameroon in London is the diplomatic mission of Cameroon in the United Kingdom.

A protest was held outside the embassy in 2013 following the murder of Cameroonian gay-rights activist Eric Lembembe. This led to several more protests in Cameroon, especially in the southern regions.

Gallery

References

External links
 Official site

Cameroon
Diplomatic missions of Cameroon
Cameroon–United Kingdom relations
Buildings and structures in the Royal Borough of Kensington and Chelsea
Holland Park